Evie Hudak (born 1951) is an American politician who served in the Colorado Senate from the 19th district as a member of the Democratic Party from 2009 to 2013. Prior to her tenure in the state senate she served on the Colorado State Board of Education from the 2nd congressional district from 2001 to 2009.

Hudak was born in New York City, and later worked at Westword. She unsuccessfully ran for a seat in the state house in the 1994 election, but lost to Republican nominee Mark Paschall. She was elected and reelected to the state board of education in 2000 and 2006. Hudak was elected to the state senate in the 2008 election and her reelection in the 2012 election was attributed to a spoiler candidate. She resigned in 2013 rather than face a recall election and was replaced by Rachel Zenzinger.

Early life and education

Evie Hudak was born in New York City in 1951. She married Edward Hudak, with whom she had one child. She has a bachelor of Arts degree in English and education. She worked as the listings editor for Westword.

Career

Early politics

Hudak ran for a seat in the Colorado House of Representatives from the 29th district with the Democratic nomination in the 1994 election, but lost to Republican nominee Mark Paschall and placed ahead of independent candidate Joanne Conte. She was elected to a seat on the Colorado State Board of Education from the 2nd congressional district with the Democratic nomination in the 2000 election against Republican nominee Ron J. Marquez. She was reelected without opposition in the 2006 election. Angelika Schroeder was selected to replace her on the Board of Election after Hudak was elected to the Colorado Senate in the 2008 election. Hudak supported Barack Obama during the 2008 Democratic presidential primaries.

Colorado Senate

Senator Sue Windels, a member of the state senate from the 19th district, was term-limited during the 2008 election. Hudak won the Democratic nomination without opposition and defeated Republican nominee Libby Szabo in the general election. She defeated Republican nominee Lang Sias and Libertarian nominee Lloyd A. Sweeny in the 2012 election. Sweeny was considered a spoiler candidate as Hudak won with a plurality of the vote.

In 2013, Senate President John Morse and Senator Angela Giron were defeated in recall elections organized by gun rights activists. A recall was being organized against Hudak due to her support of gun control legislation. She resigned on November 27, stating that she was doing it to protect the gun control legislation as if she had lost the recall election it would allow the Republicans to gain control of the state senate. She also stated that she resigned in order for $200,000 to not be spent on a recall election. Representative Tracy Kraft-Tharp initially ran to be appointed to replace Hudak, but dropped out and endorsed former Representative Sara Gagliardi. Rachel Zenzinger was selected by the vacancy committee on December 10 to replace Hudak.

Later life

Hudak served as a delegate to the Democratic National Convention for Hillary Clinton from the 7th congressional district during the 2016 Democratic presidential primaries. She endorsed Andrew Romanoff for the Democratic nomination during the 2020 United States Senate election.

Political positions

Hudak sponsored legislation to prohibit leg shackles and waist restraints on women in prison during childbirth. She and Senator Linda Newell sponsored legislation to end zero tolerance policies in schools and make mandatory expulsion only available when a student brought a gun to school. In 2009, the state senate voted seventeen to eighteen, with Hudak in favor, against repealing capital punishment.

Electoral history

References

Living people
Democratic Party Colorado state senators
Women state legislators in Colorado
American gun control activists
1951 births
School board members in Colorado
21st-century American politicians
21st-century American women politicians